Luis Eduardo Díaz Granados Torres (born 15 July 1970) is a Colombian businessman and politician, currently serving in the Senate of Colombia. He was previously elected to two terms in the Chamber of Representatives.

References

Living people
1970 births
Colombian politicians